Calyxochaetus is a genus of flies in the family Dolichopodidae. It was formerly considered a subgenus of Sympycnus, but it is now considered a separate genus.

Species
 Calyxochaetus arizonicus (Harmston, 1968)
 Calyxochaetus binodatus (Harmston & Knowlton, 1940)
 Calyxochaetus cilifemoratus (Van Duzee, 1924)
 Calyxochaetus clavicornis (Van Duzee, 1930)
 Calyxochaetus distortus (Van Duzee, 1930)
 Calyxochaetus fortunatus (Wheeler, 1899)
 Calyxochaetus frontalis (Loew, 1861)
 Calyxochaetus furcatus (Van Duzee, 1929)
 Calyxochaetus hardyi (Harmston & Knowlton, 1940)
 Calyxochaetus hastatus (Van Duzee, 1930)
 Calyxochaetus inornatus (Van Duzee, 1917)
 Calyxochaetus insolitus (Van Duzee, 1932)
 Calyxochaetus isoaristus (Harmston & Knowlton, 1940)
 Calyxochaetus lamellicornis Parent, 1930
 Calyxochaetus loewi Parent, 1930
 Calyxochaetus luteipes (Van Duzee, 1923)
 Calyxochaetus metatarsalis Robinson, 1966
 Calyxochaetus millardi Meuffels & Grootaert, 1999
 Calyxochaetus nodatus (Loew, 1862)
 Calyxochaetus oreas (Wheeler, 1899)
 Calyxochaetus ornatus Parent, 1930
 Calyxochaetus patellifer Parent, 1934
 Calyxochaetus pennarista (Harmston & Knowlton, 1940)
 Calyxochaetus pictipes (Harmston & Knowlton, 1940)
 Calyxochaetus sobrinus (Wheeler, 1899)
 Calyxochaetus tripilus (Van Duzee, 1930)
 Calyxochaetus unipilus (Van Duzee, 1929)
 Calyxochaetus vegetus (Wheeler, 1899)

References 

 Nearctic

Sympycninae
Dolichopodidae genera
Diptera of North America
Taxa named by Jacques-Marie-Frangile Bigot